Jean-Toussaint Merle (10 June 1785– 27 February 1852) was a French playwright and journalist.

Biography 
Merle had a good education at the Central School of the department of Hérault before arriving in Paris in 1803. At first an employee at the Ministry of Interior, he soon left the position for military service, and returned to Paris only towards the end of 1808. He then made his debut in literature. His amiable character and easy spirit made him a reputation for indolence which seems in little agreement with the activity of his literary life. He put his name to more than one hundred and twenty plays, almost all of them made in collaboration.

In turn attached to various newspapers, he has written numerous articles in the Mercure de France, la Gazette de France, Le Nain jaune, etc. A spiritual critic and pleasant writer, he was among those who were appreciated by their contemporaries and whose name tend to disappear with the appropriateness of their works.

He married the famous actress Marie Dorval, the widow of Allan-Dorval. While he accompanied the maréchal de Bourmont as secretary and historiographer, he had the opportunity to write , 1831.

Publications

Theatre 
1810: , one-act vaudeville;
1812: , one-act comedy;
1814: , one-act comedy;
1816: ;
1817:  with Carmouche and Frédéric de Courcy, one-act vaudeville mingled with distincts, Théâtre de la Porte-Saint-Martin, September 
1819:  with Frédéric Dupetit-Méré, Eugène Cantiran de Boirie, melodrama in three acts in prose, Théâtre de la Porte-Saint-Martin, 14 April;
1820: ' with Carmouche and Frédéric de Courcy, one-act comédie en vaudevilles, Théâtre de la Porte-Saint-Martin, 25 January;
1850: , drama in three acts, imitated from Schiller;
1822: , melodrama in three acts with Hyacinthe Decomberousse, Théodore Baudouin d'Aubigny, Théâtre de la Porte-Saint-Martin, 13 August;
1822: , one act vaudeville;
1822: , féerie burlesque in two acts;
1823: , tableau militaire in two acts with Boirie, Henri Simon and Ferdinand Laloue written to celebrate the return of H.R.H. the Duke of Angoulême, music by Louis Alexandre Piccinni, Théâtre de la Porte-Saint-Martin, 15 December;
1824: , melodrama in one act and in prose with Frédéric de Courcy, music by Charles-Guillaume Alexandre, Théâtre de la Porte-Saint-Martin, 3 April;
1825: , drama in three acts imitated from Beaumarchais, with Théodore Baudouin d'Aubigny and Maurice Alhoy, Théâtre de la Porte-Saint-Martin;
1825: , vaudeville in two scenes with Marc-Antoine-Madeleine Désaugiers and Ferdinand Laloue, ballet Jean Coralli, on the occasion of the coronation of Charles X, Théâtre de la Porte-Saint-Martin, 7 June;
1826: , melodrama in three acts composed for the English mime Cook;
 , vaudeville, etc.

Journalism 
 , Paris, Léopold Collin, 1809, 2 vol. in-8°;
 , Paris, Barba, 1827, in-8°, 44 p.
 De l’Opéra, Paris, Baudouin, 1827, in-8°, 52 p.
 , 1829, in-8°;
 , 1831, in-8°.

Erxcepts collections 
 , Paris, 1808, 3 vol. in-8°;
 , Paris, 1811, 3 vol . in-8°.

Sources 
 Gustave Vapereau, Paris, Hachette, 1876,.
 François-Joseph Fétis, vol.5, Brussels, Meline, Cans and Cie, 1865,.

19th-century French journalists
French male journalists
19th-century French dramatists and playwrights
Writers from Montpellier
1785 births
1852 deaths
19th-century French male writers